Philosophy Pathways is an open access, transparent peer reviewed, electronic journal in philosophy. The editor-in-chief is Geoffrey Klempner, the former director of studies (1996–2002), Philosophical Society of England. It was established in January 2001 and is published by the partner organizations International Society for Philosophers (ISFP) and Pathways School of Philosophy (Pathways to Philosophy).

Reception 
In January 2005, The Daily Telegraph wrote, "The International Society for Philosophers, which is aimed at anyone interested in philosophy, now has 800 members in 68 countries, though it is only two years old. The society's magazine, Philosophy Pathways, goes out fortnightly to more than 1,000 addresses, and around 400 students from 40 countries have participated in its distance learning programme." In May 2014, the British philosopher and literary critic Christopher Norris sent an email to Geoffrey Klempner with the following message: "I am sending (by attachment) a poem -- actually a long verse-essay -- that you might wish to publish in a forthcoming number of Philosophy Pathways. I should perhaps explain that the piece originates in my various published exchanges with Rorty many years back, and that it responds to his challenge that philosophy should become more adventurous, exploratory, inventive, metaphorical, and -- in short -- poetic. Hence my otherwise rather odd choice of verse as a medium in which to conduct philosophical debate." On the 1st of the following June, a couple of Norris' works were published in Philosophy Pathways.

References

External links 
 
 International Society for Philosophers

Philosophy journals
Open access journals
Publications established in 2001
English-language journals
Contemporary philosophical literature
Academic journals published by learned and professional societies
Irregular journals